Numerous video games were released in 2011. Many awards went to games such as Batman: Arkham City, Portal 2, The Elder Scrolls V: Skyrim, The Legend of Zelda: Skyward Sword and Uncharted 3: Drake's Deception. 2011 also marked the worldwide release of the Nintendo 3DS.

Critically acclaimed titles
Metacritic (MC) and GameRankings (GR) are aggregators of video game journalism reviews.

Events

Hardware releases
The list of game-related hardware released in 2011 in North America.

Series with new entries
Series with new installments in 2011 include Ace Combat, Alice: Madness Returns, Assassin's Creed, Batman: Arkham, Battlefield, Call of Duty, Call of Juarez, Cities XL, Crysis, Dead Space, Deus Ex, Dragon Age, Driver, Duke Nukem, Dynasty Warriors, The Elder Scrolls, F.E.A.R, Forza Motorsport, Gears of War, Infamous, Killzone, The Legend of Zelda, LittleBigPlanet, Mario Kart, Modern Combat, Mortal Kombat, MX vs. ATV, Need for Speed, Operation Flashpoint, Pokémon, Portal, Rayman, Red Faction, Red Orchestra, Resistance, Saints Row, Star Wars: Knights of the Old Republic, Super Mario, Total War, Tropico, Uncharted, Sonic the Hedgehog, and The Witcher.

2011 saw the introduction of several new properties, including Bastion, Dark Souls, Dead Island, Homefront, L.A. Noire, Minecraft, and Rage.

Game releases
The list of games released in 2011 in North America.

January–March

April–June

July–September

October–December

See also
2011 in games

References

 
Video games by year